David Browne may refer to:

 David Browne (journalist) (born 1960), American journalist and author
 David Browne (cricketer) (born 1964), English cricketer
 David Browne (footballer) (born 1995), Papua New Guinean footballer
 David Browne (politician), Ulster Unionist politician
 Dave Browne (voice actor)
 Dave J. Browne, British game designer
 Michael Browne (cardinal) (1887–1971), Irish prelate, born David Browne

See also 
 David Brown (disambiguation)